This is a list of district police stations in Hong Kong, by police district.

Headquarters
 Hong Kong Police Headquarters, Wan Chai

Hong Kong Island
 Central
 Waterfront
 Peak (sub-station) 
 Western
 Aberdeen
 Stanley (sub-station) 
 Wan Chai
 Happy Valley
 North Point
 Chai Wan

Kowloon East
 Wong Tai Sin
 Sai Kung
 Kwun Tong
 Tseung Kwan O
 Sau Mau Ping
 Ngau Tau Kok

Kowloon West
 Tsim Sha Tsui
 Yau Ma Tei
 Sham Shui Po
 Cheung Sha Wan
 Mong Kok District 
 Kowloon City
 Hung Hom

New Territories South
 Kwai Chung
 Tsing Yi
 Tsuen Wan
 Sha Tin
 Tin Sum
 Ma On Shan
 Lantau North
 Lantau South (Mui Wo)
 Airport Police Station
 Penny's Bay Police Post

New Territories North
 Tai Po
 Sheung Shui
 Tuen Mun
 Castle Peak
 Yuen Long
 Tin Shui Wai
 Pat Heung
 Sha Tau Kok
 Lok Ma Chau
 Ta Kwu Ling

Marine 
 Marine Harbour Division 
 Marine East Division 
 Marine South Division 
 Marine West Division 
 Marine North Division 
 Cheung Chau 
 Lamma Island Police Post 
 Peng Chau Police Post

See also
 Historic police buildings in Hong Kong
 List of buildings and structures in Hong Kong

References 
 List of District Police Stations, HK Government Social Welfare Department

 

Police stations
Law enforcement-related lists